The accessory, vagus, and glossopharyngeal nerves correspond with the posterior nerve roots, and are attached to the bottom of a sulcus named the posterolateral sulcus (or dorsolateral sulcus).

Additional images

References 

Medulla oblongata